Heuchler (German for Hypocrite) is the sixth album by German industrial metal band Megaherz, released on 25 July 2008. It is the first album by the band to feature Alexander "Lex" Wohnhaas on vocals and Jürgen "Bam Bam" Wiehler as the drummer.

Track listing

Charts

References

2008 albums
Megaherz albums